The 1985 Rose Bowl Game was a postseason college football bowl game between the USC Trojans of the Pacific-10 Conference and Ohio State Buckeyes of the Big Ten Conference, held on New Year’s Day in the Rose Bowl in  
The game resulted in a  victory for the underdog

Scoring summary
First quarter
Ohio State – Spangler 21-yard field goal, 12:08 – OSU 3, USC 0
USC – Jordan 51-yard field goal, 6:52 – OSU 3, USC 3
USC – Cormier 3-yard pass from Green (Jordan kick) 1:54 – USC 10, OSU 3

Second quarter
USC – Ware 19-yard pass from Green (Jordan kick) – USC 17, OSU 3
Ohio State – Spangler 46-yard field goal, 0:00 – USC 17, OSU 6

Third quarter
Ohio State – Spangler 52-yard field goal, 6:37 – USC 17, OSU 9
USC – Jordan 51-yard field goal, 4:05 – USC 20, OSU 9

Fourth quarter
Ohio State – Carter 18-yard pass from Tomczak (Tomczak run), 7:34 – USC 20, OSU 17

Tim Green and Jack Del Rio earned the Rose Bowl MVP awards.

Highlights
 With fourth straight win, Pac-10 takes its first lead in the series with the Big Ten, 20–19
 Pac-10 has won ten of eleven, and fourteen of the last sixteen meetings
 Using a swarming defense, USC caused three Mike Tomczak interceptions
 Tomczak threw 37 passes in the game
 Ohio State kicker Rich Spangler scored a Rose Bowl-record 52-yard field goal
 USC kicker Steve Jordan had two 51-yard field goals
 Big contribution from Trojans' Tim Green and Timmie Ware, Joe Cormier, Fred Crutcher, and Kennedy Pola

Statistics
{| class=wikitable style="text-align:center"
! Statistics !!  USC  !!  Ohio State
|-
|align=left|First downs	||16	||19
|-
|align=left|Rushes–yards||42–133||34–113
|-
|align=left|Passing yards||128	||290
|-
|align=left|Passes||13–25–0||24–37–3
|-
|align=left|Total yards	||261	||403
|-
|align=left|Punts–average||7–42||4–48
|-
|align=left|Fumbles–lost ||2–1	||4–1
|-
|align=left|Turnovers by ||1	||4
|-
|align=left|Penalties–yards||4–38	||4–46
|-
|align=left|Time of possession||31:11	||28:47
|}

References

Rose Bowl
Rose Bowl Game
Ohio State Buckeyes football bowl games
USC Trojans football bowl games
Rose Bowl
Rose Bowl